This article lists the characters from the Japanese visual novel, anime and manga series Utawarerumono.

Main characters

Hakuowlo

The protagonist of first game and its re-release Prelude to the Fallen. Hakuowlo wears an irremovable half mask that covers his forehead and extends below his eyes. Eruruw, Aruruw and their grandmother find him, badly injured, in the forest near their home and nurse him back to health. It is soon apparent that he has lost all of his memories, and he finds that the state of the world varies significantly from his expectations (e.g. anatomical attributes such as ears and tails are now considered normal). Tuskur gives him, supposedly in place of his forgotten name, the name Hakuowlo (or Hakuoro) (meaning "White Emperor" in Ainu, also sometimes rendered in kanji as 白皇 which means the same thing) which was also the name of Erurū and Arurū's father, but was also his real name (Erurū and Arurū's father having been named after him, as Tuskur had fought alongside the White god in the previous war; She had immediately recognised Hakuoro as the White god).

His weapon of choice is a large metal fan that is given to him by Tuskur. He quickly captivates and gains the trust of those around him, and soon finds himself in a growing position of leadership. Although it seems for a time that his identity is Rakshain, a murderous traitor, he is eventually revealed to be the embodiment of the good half of the god Uitsalnemetea and he recalls his memories as Iceman. After Hakuowlo's final battle with the darker half of Uitsalnemetea, the halves join once again, with Hakuowlo's side straining to maintain dominance. He decides to seal himself away so that his other side will not cause any more destruction, and bids farewell to each of his comrades. Erurū confesses her love for Hakuowlo and, in the anime, the two share a kiss. Hakuowlo says that he will return and Erurū says that she will wait for him. The final scene hints that Hakuowlo does return to Erurū, and this hint is especially strong in the anime.

In Utawarerumono: Mask of Truth, it is revealed that while he did manage to return, he is confined to the boundaries of the great seal under the Onkamiyamukai in the midst of the ruins of the Onvidaikayan, where a shrine is built, and Erurū lives there as the shrine's caretaker. As a part of Uitsalnemetea, he continues to be connected to the Origin, which allows him to perceive most things, and he is aware of everything that goes on in the outside world. When Kuon is taken over by Uitsalnemetea after Haku dies from overusing his mask, Hakuowlo passes his mask and powers to Haku, allowing him to save Kuon. This has the side effect of returning Hakuowlo completely to a normal human, and in the final scene he leaves the shrine with Erurū.

In the earliest of Hakuowlo's memories, he is seen as an unnamed archeological researcher who stumbles upon Uitsalnemetea's fossil hidden in an advanced laboratory. An unknown scientist catches him and explains that he did not want anyone to know of this forgotten deity; the "missing link" in human evolution—for he felt that it should not exist. To protect the secret, he shoots the archeologist, whose blood lands on the fossil. This awakens Uitsalnemetea, who restores him to life in exchange for taking his body as a vessel. As a symbol of the contract, he wears the mask which represents Uitsalnemetea.

Centuries, or possibly millennia, later, his frozen body is found by researchers who thaw him out and dub him 'Iceman'. Under the pretense of helping him, the scientists are investigating his ability to survive in the world outside of their enclosed environment (which has become uninhabitable by humans while he was hibernating). They are also interested in further increasing their longevity. They create numerous artificial beings based on his DNA for further study, including subject #63 whom he names "Mutsumi". A sympathetic researcher allows Iceman to escape along with numerous subjects including subject #3510, whom Iceman had previously named Mikoto. They have a child together, but are both eventually recaptured. Having reproduced, Mikoto is of particular interest to the scientists, who dissect her. On learning of this, Iceman goes berserk, and his abilities as Uitsalnemetea awaken (he turns the scientists into near immortal amoeba-like entities, fulfilling their wish for longevity). Realizing what he is doing, he asks Mutsumi to destroy him; but she is unsuccessful. Instead, she manages to seal him, but he is separated into two entities: Hakuowlo, possessing his good side and his human form; and a formless evil side that must possess a host body to act physically. However, the seal cannot hold indefinitely and the two halves periodically break free. In the current timeline, Hakuowlo awakens with no memories, and the darker side possesses the Onkamiyamukai scholar, Dii.

Haku

The protagonist of Utawarerumono: Mask of Deception. An amnesiac found wandering in the mountains in a hospital gown, he is found and nursed back to health by Kuon, and subsequently taken care of by her when she finds that he is physically extremely weak by demi-human standards, being unable to perform simple tasks that even children are able to do easily. It turns out that this is due to him not being a genetically enhanced demi-human, but a regular human who was recently awakened from cold sleep. The Mikado/Emperor of Yamato later reveals to Haku that they are brothers, the Mikado having survived all this time through human experiments he had performed on himself which extended his lifespan. When Oshtor dies after defeating Vurai in a duel, Haku decides to take on his mask and pretend to be him in order to protect Anju. Before entering cold sleep he was a skilled hacker, and he was the one who stole the data on the Iceman Project which allowed his brother to create copies of Hakuowlo's mask, enabling the events of Mask of Deception to take place.

In Mask of Truth, Haku continues to pretend to be Oshtor and helps Anju to retake the capital city of Yamato from Raikou. He is then tasked by the Mikado (who had survived and gone into hiding) with finding the Master Key, a device which grants its user complete access to any and all functionality in the ruins left by mankind. He finds the Master Key in the possession of Eruru, but also encounters Wosis, who proclaims himself to be the true successor of the Onvitaikayan, and steals the key. In the final battle with Wosis, who uses the first mask made by the Mikado that was sealed away as it was too powerful, Haku overuses the power of his own mask and dies, turning to salt like Oshtor did. However, when Kuon is overwhelmed by despair and gives in to the part of Uitsalnemetea residing in her, his spirit takes the mask and powers of Hakuowlo, and he comes back to save her, before disappearing again.

Erurū

Eruru is the first person Hakuowlo sees when he wakes up after being found by her and her family. She nurses Hakuowlo back to health until he regains his strength. Eruru has a forceful, but caring, personality. She is named after a fictional flower and has dog-like ears and a tail. In the game and manga, she often states her displeasure with her small bust.

Eruru is the reincarnation of Mikoto, as shown by her ring hair ornament. Like her forebear, she falls in love with Hakuowlo and confesses her love for him, and kisses him just before he is sealed, stating that she will be waiting for his return. At the end of the anime, she continues working as a healer as she waits for Hakuowlo's return. In the last scene of the anime she turns around and sees someone or something, however who or what is not shown. Based on her reaction (a joyous smile) it may be presumed to be Hakuowlo. In the game version, this is implied even more strongly as prior to that scene, Kūya, Kamyu and Arurū are all shown acting as if they had seen Hakuowlo again.

Arurū

Arurū is Erurū's shy, quiet younger sister, and a friend to Yuzuha and Camyu. Like Erurū, she is also named after a fictional flower. It is said that the Erurū and Arurū flowers grow together. When she first meets Hakuowlo, she is shy and reticent, running and hiding from Hakuowlo whenever she encounters him and speaking very little. Hakuowlo eventually wins over Arurū's affections, and she starts calling him . How Hakuowlo does so depends on whether one is playing the game or watching the anime. In the game, Arurū warms up to Hakuowlo after he shares some freshly harvested honeycomb with her. In the anime, Hakuowlo wins over Arurū by sparing the life of a baby white tiger, even though its mother, Mutikapa, a large white tiger with special traits, had killed many innocent people (and despite the fact that almost all the villagers wanted the baby tiger killed; they were, however, willing to defer to Hakuowlo's judgment since his plan had saved their lives). Regardless, in both the game and the anime, Arurū raises the baby tiger, naming it Mukkuru. After it grows (in an astoundingly short period of time), she rides him into battle, often in spite of orders or warnings to stay away from danger. This results in her being heavily wounded and presumably dying while trying to protect Hakuowlo from Hauenka, and she is revived by Hakuowlo/Uitsalnemetea. It is later revealed that Arurū had been severely injured in an earthquake prior to meeting Hakuowlo and that Eruru was unable to do anything for her. Uitsalnemetea happened to be passing by and healed her in exchange of Eruru's body, heart and soul.

In Utawarerumono: Mask of Deception, Arurū appears to be about 10 years older and developing in to a young woman. She treats Kuon as her younger sister.

Kuon

A demi-human with a prehensile tail that is the main heroine of Utawarerumono: Mask of Deception. She was raised by Hakuowlo's wives, and she refers to Eruru, Touka, and Ulthury as her mothers, and Aruru and Camyu as her sisters (she thinks of Karulau as a mother, but Karulau insists on her referring to her as a sister). She inherits some of Uitsalnemetea's powers, giving her inhuman strength and the ability to control fire and ice at will. She takes a strong interest in ancient ruins. At the start of Mask of Deception, she has run away from home to go on a journey exploring the world.

In the short OVA Utawarerumono: Tusukuru-kouji no Karei Naru Hibi, included with the premium collection release of the PS4 remake of Utawarerumono: Chiriyukumono e no Komoriuta. The anime tells the story of Kuon's childhood days. She is a toddler still living at the palace, Oboro is stating that she is his "little darling", and we see that when Kuon gets angry her hair color changes and everyone seems to fear her.

Tuskur

Oboro

Oboro in the beginning was an impulsive and somewhat egotistical bandit chief of a village near the one which Hakuoro dwells in. Overpowering these traits, however, is his care for his younger sister, Yuzuha, to whom he would bring Tusukuru to oversee her health. When Hakuowlo becomes the leader of the country's rebellion, Oboro joins forces with Hakuowlo and swears eternal allegiance, with revenge for Tuskur among his reasons, calling Hakuowlo his brother. Oboro's main weapons of choice are two long, light swords, which he uses to execute swift fighting techniques.

Oboro has stayed with Hakuowlo since the establishment of the nation Tuskur, aiding in battle and any other way which he can. The name Oboro (朧) means haziness, gloominess, and dreariness in Japanese. In the conclusion to the series, he is entrusted with the title of Emperor, but he realizes that he is not ready to become a ruler and leaves Tuskur to train himself. He is in fact the child of the previous emperor who had lost his position after fighting alongside the White God in the previous war, and losing, and Benawi is a distant relative of him. In the game, Oboro forsakes the duties of Emperor and entrust the title to Benawi instead. He then leaves on a journey with Yuzuha's child to show it the world. In Mask of Deception he has become the emperor of Tuskur with Benawi as his samurai general.

Dorī & Gurā

Voiced by: Akeno Watanabe (Japanese), Brittney Karbowski (Dori), & Nancy Novotny (Gura) (English)
Dori and Gura are twin archers serving under Oboro. There are several ways to tell them apart: Dori has purple eyes while Gura's are blue, and the bottom part of Dori's clothes is blue while Gura's are red. Their gender is difficult to ascertain, even by other characters. In the game, Oboro and the twins themselves state that they are male. This scene was not adapted in the anime version, and no mention of their gender can be found in the anime itself. However, in the DVD Q&A segment "The Hows and Whys of Utawarerumono", Hakuoro directly addresses the question of their gender, openly stating that the twins are male and heavily implying that their feminine behavior is a result of their traumatic past. In both versions of events, Dori and Gura get their lord Oboro drunk, resulting in Oboro waking up with the twins in his arms and finding that all three of them are naked. In the conclusion of both the game and anime, they stay with Oboro as he travels the world. In Mask of Deception they continue to accompany Oboro as his retainers.

Benawi

Benawi is a mononofu of Kenashikourupe. When Hakuowlo's rebellion overtakes Kenashikourupe, Benawi realizes defeat and kills the emperor, Inkara, to spare him from possible torture and humiliation. Benawi then attempts suicide, but Hakuoro stops him, convincing Benawi to join him. Benawi has a strong sense of responsibility to his country. He has a calm and logical personality, but gets irritated when Hakuowlo ignores his duties as a ruler. Benawi's main weapon of choice is a polearm much like a voulge, which he uses most effectively while riding. In the conclusion of the game and anime, Oboro passes the title of Emperor to him before leaving to see the world. The two promise to meet again "sometime".

In Utawarerumono: Mask of Deception he has become the samurai general of Tuskur, and easily defends it from the Yamato invasion even when Munechika uses her mask's powers against him.

Kurou

He is the fiercely loyal second-in-command of Benawi's cavalry men, and the former samurai leader over the country of Kenashikourupe, though neither he nor Benawi seem to care for the emperor so much as they do for the empire. When the emperor falls, he remains loyal to Benawi, and, in turn, to Hakuowlo, to whom Benawi swears allegiance. Kurou tends to be a source of comedic relief in the anime. He is usually seen either arguing with Oboro, due to Kurou's teasing of Oboro, helping to plan military actions, training with his men, or using a thick, long sword with immense skill, cutting down his opponents. Even without his steed or any weapons, he is shown to be capable of defeating a small army with his bare hands, alone. At the game's conclusion, he remains loyal to Benawi and most likely becomes his retainer.

In Mask of Deception he remains by Benawi's side as his right hand and became much stronger than before when he defeated Kuon, Atuy and Jachdwalt alone.

Yuzuha

Yuzuha is Oboro's younger sister and friend to Arurū and Camyu. She is blind and has been very sick with an unknown illness all her life. Although bedridden most of the time, her senses of smell and hearing have been whetted by her lack of sight, enabling her to recognize a person by their scent or even the sound of their footsteps. Yuzuha possesses a gentle persona, which she made especially apparent when dealing with her older brother, and in the fact that she refuses to let an animal die in the hope of obtaining a cure for her. Sadly, at the end of the last episode (set an unknown time after the events of the main series, but with the characters of similar age and appearance) she is presumed to have died, as Oboro is seen visiting her grave and leaving behind the bell that she liked.

In the game, she bears Hakuoro's child, which is healthy by virtue of his divine blood. The child turns out to be Kuon who lost her mother on her birth. Oboro cares for the child in place of his late sister, and leaves on a journey to show it the world.

Touka

Touka is an Evenkuruga mononofu (warrior) who serves Lord Orikakan. After Orikakan is murdered by Yue, she swears vengeance. After seeing the respect which Hakuowlo pays to the fallen emperor, she pledges fealty to Hakuoro to serve as his bodyguard and, omitted from her spoken oath but firmly kept in her mind, bear him a child. In the game, she pledges fealty because Aruru and Eruru convince her that Hakuowlo is a good person. True to her clan's nature she obsessively follows this oath. However, even though it was part of her oath, she fails to have a baby with him, because Karulau tricks her into thinking that she would become pregnant by drinking Hakuoro's semen (this only happens in the game). She fights using a slim sword which she combines with her astonishing agility to execute swift and deadly attacks.

Touka is a member of the Evenkuruga tribe, a small clan living near the steppes, who are blessed with such extraordinary fighting abilities that many of them have carved their names in history. They are a deeply moralistic people and side with good and fight evil in the name of justice and honor. This is mentioned several times during the anime. At the end of the series she works with Karura as a wandering mercenary and follows Hakuoro's request to act as a protector of the weak.

She is sometimes seen as the comic relief, mostly due to her over-protectiveness of Hakuowlo (as seen when she picks through every piece of a fish, searching for poison, before letting the new Emperor eat it) and her feminine side, which conflicts with her warrior-like persona.

In Utawarerumono: Mask of Deception she is seen working in Karulau's inn, Hakurou-kaku in Yamato, where she was formerly a yojimbo bodyguard but chose to become a regular worker due to the city having good security, resulting in her not having anything to do as a bodyguard. Kuon calls her "Mother Touka".

Karulauatsuurei (Karura)

Karulau was once princess of Na-Tunku before the Shakukoporu deposed her and placed a puppet leader at the head of the state. She joins Hakuowlo after she is found having slaughtered many soldiers from another country who were holding her prisoner. Despite showing concern for her country (which she conceals), she has forsaken her past as royalty and decided to live her life as Karulau, a simple woman, and as a sign of this vow continues to wear a large metal collar around her neck placed there in her captivity. She is one of the last two Giriyaginas on Earth, along with Derihourai, her younger brother.

She is often seen drinking sake, even on the battle field (she could drink several barrels of sake in one day). Karura wields a massive black blade (personally designed to not break, not dull and not need resharpening), which is so ridiculously large and heavy that no one else can lift it. She uses it in conjunction with her superhuman strength to deal tremendous damage to her enemies. The name Karura (迦楼羅, 迦樓羅, or 迦留羅), also known as Garuda and Garua, comes from the Hindu and Buddhist myth of the man-bird deity. Her weapon can be said to be a powerful limiter on her body, for when she throws it down to fight under her own power, she is blindingly fast. At the end of the series she and Touka become famous wandering mercenaries.

In Utawarerumono: Mask of Deception she runs the inn Hakurou-kaku in Yamato. Even though she was one of the women that raised Kuon, she insists that Kuon call her "Sister Karulau" instead on "Mother Karulau".

Tusukur

Tuskur is Erurū's and Arurū's grandmother and village elder, the leader of the village. She is a very kind person and is respected by everyone in the village and even some out of it. She is fatally stabbed while protecting Aruru from an attack by one of Nuwangi's soldiers (although Nuwangi did not actually order the attack, and in fact scolded the soldier afterwards for hurting Tusukuru since Tuskur nursed Nuwangi as a very small child [Tuskur had publicly embarrassed Nuwangi earlier by reminding him of that]).

After Kenashikourupe falls, Hakuowlo renames the country Tuskur in her honor. Ignorance of the Ainu language results in her name being frequently transliterated wrongly; it is supposed to be Tusukur (a word translated to Japanese as miko).

Teoro

Teoro is a villager who quickly becomes friends with Hakuowlo (who he refers to as 'An-chan'). His weapon of choice is an axe. His wife is a bossy blonde woman named Sopoku (ソポク),, who is always scolding him for skipping out on work or being drunk. He returns to his home with his wife and neighbours after Kenashikourupe falls, which becomes their downfall when Kuccha Keccha invades. Although fatally wounded, he is able to make the journey to warn Hakuoro. He is so successful in hiding his wounds that Hakuowlo and his court do not learn that he was injured until they discover his body slumped at the foot of a bloodstained pillar when they return after the battle.

Chikinaro

Chikinaro is a somewhat shady merchant with a habit of mysteriously appearing when called. He makes his first appearance as a spy paid by Benawi to infiltrate the rebellion's headquarters. He later assists Hakuowlo in obtaining the ingredients needed to make the explosives used to repel Shikerpecim's initial attack. He is also the one responsible for procuring Karura's unique sword, as well as Aruru's pet Gacatar.

Mukkuru

Mukkuru is a white tiger offspring of Mutikapa, one of Arurū's animals, and is almost always seen with her. He is Mutikapa's son and was rescued by Arurū after his mother was killed by Hakuowlo and the other villagers in self-defense. Despite his mother's attitude, Mukkuru is sweet and playful, and although he loves to eat, he does not eat humans. Like Arurū, he is easily cowed by Erurū's scolding.

Kenashikourupe

Nuwangi

Nuwangi is a white haired youth and childhood friend of Erurū. Nuwangi, now older, is exceedingly arrogant, abusing the power of his higher rank, given by his father. Nuwangi is first seen trying to gain more supplies from the village. Nuwangi personally likes to go to this village so he can meet Erurū, though after his shameful departure, he knocks over an altar, angering the being to which it was dedicated. Nuwangi is rather protective over his nonexistent relationship with Erurū and is quick to jump to conclusions.

Nuwangi exhibits some cowardly traits, fleeing for his life upon seeing Hakuowlo invading in retaliation for Tusukuu's death. After Nuwangi's father is slain due to this negligence, he flees to his uncle for further protection. In the game it is revealed that his father is associated with the death of his mother, and he kills his own father sadistically. After Nuwangi himself repeatedly fails and his uncle, the emperor, is killed as well, Nuwangi is captured by Hakuowlo. To his surprise, he is freed from his bonds from Erurū, effectively allowing him to leave without harm. Nuwangi seems to be devastated by this, vanishing off into the mist, never to be heard of, or seen again.

In the game, he is killed by bandits and beheaded to bring to the rebellion forces.

Sasante

Nuwangi's father, a local Feudal lord that governs the village in the province where both Erurū and Arurū live during his time as lord. Hakuowlo was already living at the village in the anime when he arrives searching for a thief who broke into their mansion. He and Nuwangi demand the village turn the thief over, and at this point Tusukuru confronts them, which led to her death at the hand of his bodyguards. With this, they were attacked by the villagers at the station, where he was killed by Hakuoro.

In the game it is revealed that he had a hand in the death of his wife and Nuwangi's mother, and that Nuwangi killed him for it, sadistically.

Inkara

Emperor of Kenashikourupe, and Nuwangi's uncle (Sasante's elder brother). During his time as Emperor of Kenashikourupe, he oppresses his people without  even caring about them, to the point of the rebellion that Hakuowlo led against him. He believes it to be a minor nuisance easily exterminated, even ordering Benawi to show no mercy to the rebels, even women and children, and demands revenge for the murder of his brother.

In the end, his armies were defeated, and the rebellion grew too large to the point of his palace being surrounded. He was killed by Benawi to spare him from possible torture and humiliation.

Onkamiyamukai

Ulthury

Ulthury is the first princess of Onkamiyamukai. She decides to become the yomoru (priest sent to look out for a country's welfare) of Tuskur. She quickly gains great respect and admiration for Hakuowlo, after seeing how kind and wise he is. Near the end of the anime, she is given the title of Head Priestess, and vows to watch over Hakuowlo's resting place.

Camyu

Kamyu is the second princess of Onkamiyamukai, and the younger sister of Ulthury. She befriends Arurū, Yuzuha, and Mukkuru, and is often seen playing with them. Previously, she had no friends (apart from her sister) and everyone in the mediators considered her to be a monster because she was born with black wings.

In Utawarerumono: Mask of Deception she looks about 10 years older and has developed in to a young woman. She treats Kuon as her younger sister.

Mutsumi is Uitsalnemetea's "daughter," as well as the one who sealed Witsarunemitea away. She now lives on inside Camyu as a split personality inherited through blood lines. Her name is derived from the number 63.

Kunnekamun

Kūya Amururineuruka

Kūya is the young ruler of Kunnekamun. She arranges a secret meeting with Hakuowlo prompted by her curiosity about his seemingly supernatural success. The secret meetings continue for some time and they eventually become friends. She pilots a silver Avu-Kamuu. Kūya cares for the welfare of her people, but is unsure of the best course of action. Swayed by the more vocal of her advisers, her subsequent decisions lead to a war on all fronts with all other countries allying against her. She takes part in the first battles and, not used to war, is greatly affected by her own actions and those of her compatriots. Later in the series, after witnessing Genjimaru's death and Hakuowlo's true form, she suffers a psychotic break and reverts to the mentality of a young child. Hakuowlo takes her into his household where she is well looked after.

Genjimaru

Genjimaru is an old Evenkuruga, but extremely powerful mononofu serving under Kūya. He is also Hien and Sakuya's grandfather. His main weapon of choice is a long sword. He was instrumental in helping the other nations defeating the Avu-Kamuu, by revealing their weakness. He would later be killed by Dii as "payment" in canceling Kūya's contract.

Sakuya

Sakuya is one of Kūya's attendants and Genjimaru's granddaughter. Kūya offered her to Hakouwlo as a concubine, stating that she was "good in bed", an offer he declined. What Kūya meant to say, however, was that Sakuya was "good at making beds", which would have caused much less embarrassment for Sakuya, Eruru and Hakuowlo.

Hien

Hien is Sakuya's brother, and Genjimaru's grandson. He pilots a blue Avu-Kamuu armed with a massive blade. He is the more level headed one between him and Hauenkua. He also advocated that Kūya should unite the nations in peace, but under their rule. In the game, he advocates starting global war and destroying all enemy villagers just like Hauenkua, except unlike Hauenkua, he believes that he is doing it for a good cause rather than for pleasure. When Dii revealed himself, Hien willingly joined him. He is killed by Hakuoro/Witsuarunemitea, who was trying to end the war.

Hauenkua

Hauenkua serves under Kūya Amururineuruka and has roughly the same status as Hien. He pilots a red Avu-Kamuu, with customized claws on each arm. He is psychopathic and is greatly entertained by war and suffering as long as someone else is suffering. When confronted by his own mortality, as when Hakuoro/Uitsualnemetea destroyed his Avu-Kamuu, he flees in a sobbing panic. He meets his end at the hands of Hakuoro/Uitsualnemetea after Hakuoro tries to end the conflict with Kunnekamun by trying to reason with Kūya.

Yamato

Oshtor
/

One of the two captains of the royal guard. Wise, skilled and charismatic, he is both trusted by the Mikado as well as loved by the people of Yamato. He is also one of the four generals granted a mask by the Mikado which grants him the power to transform into a giant monster reminiscent of Hakuoro's Witsarunemitea form.

While he tries to do his best for the people of Yamato, his high position frequently puts him at an inability to act and so he sometimes uses the disguise of Ukon (in which he removes his mask and puts on a fake beard) and the employment of Haku to do so. In the climax of Mask of Deception, he is accused of assassinating the Mikado and attempting to assassinate princess Anju and imprisoned, but rescued by Haku. When they are pursued by Vurai, however, he remains behind and the two duel in their transformed forms. Due to Nekone's interference, he fails to land his first finishing blow and takes a hit meant for her, and though he still manages to defeat Vurai this costs him his life, and he hands his mask to Haku.

Nekone

Oshtor's sister. When she tries to help him in his duel against Vurai she ends up causing his finishing blow to miss, and ultimately causes him to use too much of his mask's power, resulting in his death.

The Emperor

The emperor of Yamato, actually a human scientist who survived Witsarunemitea's attack on humankind and lived all this time through experiments he had conducted on himself which extended his lifespan. He created not just the country of Yamato but also its people through using the data his brother (Haku) had stolen from the Iceman project via hacking. His wife and daughter were turned to Tatari (slime monsters) before his eyes, and his ultimate goal is to restore the old race of man.

Honoka and Anju are copies of his wife and daughter made with their genetic material. When he reveals his true identity to Haku he also reveals that he is dying, and wants Haku to take over for him and restore mankind. His invasion of Tusukuru is to gain access to the ruins under Onkamiyamukai, but he is assassinated via poison before this can be accomplished and the invasion fails. He is seemingly slightly senile due to his age, and cannot recall his brother's name, and ends up just calling him Haku.

Mikazuchi

One of the two royal guard captains, a masked one, and a friend of Oshutoru. Like Oshutoru, he also disguises himself in order to know the people of Yamato better, and his disguise is that of Sakon, an aged candy vendor. His mask grants him the power to control lightning and move at great speeds.

Munechika

One of the eight generals of Yamato and a masked one. Her main role is the defense of the imperial capital, and looking after princess Anju. However, she is sent to Tusukuru as part of the invasion force, and remains behind to defend retreating forces when the invasion fails. Her mask gives her the power to create a massive barrier that moves along with her and can crush enemy forces.

Vurai

One of the eight generals of Yamato and a masked ones. A large man who is blindly loyal to the Mikado, he also believes solely in power and does not think of Anju as a fitting successor to him, and when the Mikado passes away he plots to take over as emperor of Yamato. His plot fails when Anju is rescued by Oshutoru and Haku, and he perishes in a final duel against Oshutoru. His mask grants him the power to control fire and transform into a giant monster reminiscent of Dii's Witsarunemitea form, but with a head similar to that of a hammerhead shark.

Woshis

One of the eight generals of Yamato and is a revered writer. He is known for his Taoist writings and for writing Yaoi stories under the name Rarau-sensei. In actuality he was the Emperor's son and was a copy like Anju, but of the Emperor himself. Being raised under the belief that he will be the one who will restore humanity, it was eventually proven that as a copy, he could not activate it, and he became bitter and spiteful about the true successor, Haku.

He eventually killed his father and was responsible for the coup, and sided with Raikou to further his goals. After Haku as Oshutoru restored order to Yamato, he revealed his intentions and proceeded to Tusukuru, where he got the Master Key from Hakuoro and headed back to Yamato so he could restore humanity at the cost of the current race. There he gains the allegiance of the cursed humans, and dons a mask that the Emperor had hidden away due to its uncontrollable power. After surviving being hit with an orbital cannon that destroyed the capital of Yamato, he faces off against his uncle and allies and was finally vanquished by Haku at the cost of his life. Woshisu's mask basically turned him into Witsarunemitea that looked similar to Dii's form, but the powers were subpar to the real one's power.

Raikou

One of the eight generals of Yamato, and Mikazuchi's older brother. He wins wars without actually fighting any battles, thinking of his soldiers as no more than chess pieces, and Munechika says that he would resort to any means to win. He plots against Munechika and the Mikado.

Rulutieh

One of Haku and Kuon's companions. She is the last princess to Kujuuri, vassal state to the Yamato Empire. A very timid girl yet very caring even towards her enemies. She is accompanied a large flightless bird named Kokopo.

Kiwru

One of Haku and Kuon's companions. He is the prince to En'nakamuy, vassal state to the Yamato Empire. He is a skilled archer. He serves as Oshtor's guard and respects him, although he has a crush for his sister Nekone.

Atuy

One of Haku and Kuon's companions. Daughter of Soyankekuru, who is one of Yamato's eight generals and lord of Shahhoro, one of Yamato's vassal states. "Atuy" is Ainu for "ocean".

Nosuri

One of Haku and Kuon's companions. She and her brother Ougi are outlaws working for Oshtor as spies in the criminal underworld. She is naïve and hot-headed yet a skilled fighter and archer. Nosuri and Ougi turns out to be Evenkurugas like Touka

Ougi

One of Haku and Kuon's companions and Nosuri's brother. Unlike his sister, he is professional on his spy occupation. He is a skilled swordsman

Jachdwalt

One of Haku and Kuon's companions who is encountered during Uzurusha's invasion of Yamato. He is known as the "Mirage Blade", the master swordsman from Letarmoshiri who won tournaments in Yamato. He initially fought against Yamato when the Uzurushans held his land and niece Shinonon hostage, he immediately changed sides when he found out that Shinonon has been freed.

Other country leaders

Orikakan

Orikakan is the lord of Kuccha Keccha, a small country renowned for the skill and zeal of its cavalry, and is an excellent tactician.

Orikakan is obsessed with gaining revenge against Hakuoro, believing him to be "Rak Shine", a traitor to Kuccha Keccha, who murdered his wife, children, and hundreds of other people. The murdered wife was Orikakan's sister, whose death is the primary reason for his zeal in pursuing revenge. He seeks to attain his revenge by attacking Tusukuru. He personally leads the attack on Yamayura, slaying all the inhabitants, and prompting Hakuoro to declare war on Kuccha Keccha. While initially Hakuoro believes he might indeed be "Rak Shine" (since Hakuoro lost all of his memories and cannot remember who he was, traitor or not, before Eruruu found him injured in the woods), Orikakan turns out to be mistaken, manipulated by another agency into falsely believing that Hakuoro was "Rak Shine." He was eventually killed by Niwe when his purpose was fulfilled, before Hakuoro is able to hear all he has to say.

Niwe

Niwe is lord of Shikerpecim, a country of vast strength that was three times bigger than Tusukuru, and had ten times the military power. Niwe initiates numerous and lengthy attacks against Tusukuru in an attempt to draw out Hakuoro's inner beast. It is later revealed that he was working with Dii, from whom he learned Hakuoro's true identity. In their final confrontation, Niwe finally succeeds in drawing out the demigod slumbering within Hakuoro. His amazement is cut short however, as the raging beast tears Niwe to pieces, signaling the downfall of Shikerpecim. Niwe, despite his gruesome death, continues to harass Hakuoro through nightmares later on.

Derihourai

Derihourai is Karura's younger brother. He later becomes the lord of the newly created country, Karurauatsuurei, which is named after Karura. Derihourai's main weapon of choice is the tonfa.

Suwonkas

Suwonkas is the emperor of Na Tunk. He is somewhat insane and extremely sadistic, with an entire garden of flowers grown on the bodies of live humans. He was apparently infatuated with Karura, who apparently castrated him in the past, an action that, oddly enough, he expresses gratitude for. He is killed by Derihourai during the Karurawaturei's rebellion.

Kanhordari

Kanhordari is the despotic emperor of Noseshecika, one of the three great countries alongside Onkamiyamukai and Kunnekamun. Large and physically dominating, he seems to hold a grudge against Kunnekamun and attempts to conquer them, although this attempt backfires horribly when Kunnekamun counterattacks with the Avu-Kamuu, conquering Noseshecika and killing Kanhordari. His body is eventually reanimated by Dii and destroyed for good by Hakuoro's forces.

Misc

Dii

Dii was an Onkamiya scholar that wandered inside the cave where Witsuarunemitea's soul was sealed. Just as Hakuoro is the Iceman's 'good' side, Dii is now possessed by Witsuarunemitea's darker side. He instigates and catalyzes wars far and wide so that Witsuarunemitea's children (all races are descended from beings created from Iceman, Witsuarunemitea's avatar) could, via natural selection, reach greater heights. Dii, unlike Hakuoro, has complete conscious control of his abilities and is able to dispense with the powerful Genjimaru without visible effort. At the conclusion of his final battle with Hakuoro, Dii's mortal form is destroyed, and the dark half of Witsuarunemitea's soul that dwelled within him is reunited with Hakuoro.

Mikoto

Mikoto was an artificial being presumably created from Iceman's DNA. Initially called by her experiment number, 3510, she was named Mikoto by Iceman. She and Iceman were allowed to escape from the laboratory by a sympathetic researcher and had a child together. They were later recaptured and she, having given birth to a child, was dissected by scientists for research purposes. She is eventually reincarnated as Eruru. The word Mikoto can also be written as 命, which can also be pronounced as 'inochi', meaning 'life'.

Mizushima
Mizushima is a faceless researcher responsible for working with Iceman. Although he maintains a professional relationship with Iceman, upon learning that the research team plans to permanently refreeze Iceman, he betrays his fellow humans and helps Iceman escape to the surface, giving him the master key which would later become Erurū's hair ornament. It is implied that he was eventually found out by the humans, although his fate is unknown.

Characters added from consumer version

Kamuchatāru

Inkara's daughter who only appears in the OAV series and PS2 version of the game. She is a long-time acquaintance of Benawi and Kurou because they served her father. She also runs a bar in a fairly seedy district of the capital city and has a one-sided crush on Kurou. In the PS2 game she seeks revenge against them after the Tusukuru nation is established.

Nopon

An apostate priest of Onkamiyamukai who serves Kamuchatāru with unshakeable loyalty. Frequently proclaiming himself to be a genius, he is surprisingly knowledgeable of very advanced bishop-level magics. Has a scruffy, generically villainous appearance.

Gomuta

A super-intelligent kimamau (monkey-beast) capable of understanding human speech, though still no stronger than other kimamau.

See also
List of Utawarerumono episodes

References

Utawarerumono